Michael F. Bartlett is an American filmmaker, producer, screenwriter, and editor.

Life and career 

Bartlett directed 'Breaking Bad' series star R.J. Mitte in his first feature film, the supernatural thriller 'House of Last Things.' Bartlett sometimes stages his screenplays within his own residences, and 'House of Last Things' was written to fit the location exactly.

Filmography

References

External links
 

American film directors
American male screenwriters
Living people
Year of birth missing (living people)